Early parliamentary elections were held in Greece on 8 April 1990. The conservative New Democracy party of Constantine Mitsotakis, was elected, defeating PASOK of Andreas Papandreou. In order to be able to command a majority of 151 in the 300-seat Parliament, New Democracy had to secure the support of Theodoros Katsikis, Democratic Renewal's sole MP. Shortly after Mitsotakis was given a confidence vote, the Supreme Special Court, after a mistake in seat calculation was detected, gave the coalition of New Democracy and Democratic Renewal a 152nd seat.

Results

References

Parliamentary elections in Greece
Greece
Legislative
1990s in Greek politics
Greece